Sakeereen Teekasom (born February 27, 1990), simply known as Cristian, is a Thai professional footballer who plays as a right back and defensive area for Thai League 3 club Jalor City.

Honours

Club
Satun United
 Regional League South Division runners-up: 2009
Chiangmai
 Regional League Northern Division (1) : 2010
Lamphun Warrior
 Regional League Championships Group Stage: 2011
Pattani
 Regional League Championships Group Stage: 2012
Buriram United
 Mekong Club Championship: 2016

References

siamsport.co.th
smmsport.com

1990 births
Living people
Sakeereen Teekasom
Sakeereen Teekasom
Association football central defenders
Sakeereen Teekasom
Sakeereen Teekasom
Sakeereen Teekasom
Sakeereen Teekasom
Sakeereen Teekasom
Sakeereen Teekasom
Sakeereen Teekasom
Sakeereen Teekasom